Socialist Youth (Norwegian: Sosialistisk Ungdom) is the youth league of the Socialist Left Party of Norway. The current head of the organisation is Synnøve Kronen Snyen. SU considers itself a revolutionary party consisting of Marxists and wants to gain popular support for socialism in Norway. In this respect it differs from SV, the mother party.

SU organises some 850 members between the age of 13 and 30. They have regional branches in all 19 counties, and have around 60 local groups. At several universities and colleges SU also organises student groups.

SU does well in school elections in urban areas, but has less support in rural regions and in the north of Norway. They are particularly occupied with school students' rights and propose that all students be given educational material free of charge. They also fight against sexual harassment and for stronger government protection of workers' rights, particularly for apprentices and young workers. SU has also been a part of the left-wing resistance against global interventionist wars such as the war in Iraq. The fight against racism has also become an increasingly important issue for SU.

Leaders
 Monica Schancke 1975
 Asbjørn Eidhammer, Ingrid Ofstad 1975–1976
 Erik Solheim 1977–1980
 Øystein Gudim 1980–1982
 Jan Morten Torrisen, Kristin Halvorsen, Sverre Pedersen, Hanne Lyssand, Siri Aasheim 1982–1984
 Kristin Halvorsen 1984–1986
 Raymond Johansen 1986–1988
 Paul Chaffey 1988–1990
 Lisbet Rugtvedt 1990–1992
 Kyrre Lekve 1992–1994
 Andreas Tjernshaugen 1994–1996
 Heikki Holmås 1996–1999
 Kari Anne Moe 1999–2002
 Ingrid Fiskaa 2002–2004
 Audun Herning 2004–2006
 Kirsti Bergstø 2006–2008
 Mali Steiro Tronsmoen 2008–2010
 Olav Magnus Linge 2010–2012
 Andreas Halse 2012–2014
 Nicholas Wilkinson 2014–2016
 Andrea Sjøvoll 2016–2018
 Andreas Sjalg Unneland 2018–2020
Synnøve Kronen Snyen 2020–

References

External links
 SU

Opposition to the Iraq War
Socialism in Norway
Youth wings of political parties in Norway